was a Japanese piracy website that primarily hosted popular Japanese manga books. Besides manga books, it also hosted pirated copies of magazines and photo-books.

Mangamura spiked in popularity in 2017. According to SimilarWeb, an estimated 98 million people visited the website in January 2018, placing it the thirty-first most visited website in Japan that month.

In 2017, Kodansha and multiple other publishers filed a criminal complaint against Mangamura for alleged violation of the copyright law of Japan. In February 2018, Manga Japan (マンガジャパン), an association of manga artists, issued a statement urging people not to visit the website.

In March 2018, Mangamura announced its paid subscription plan named "Mangamura Pro" (漫画村プロ).

On April 13, 2018, the Japanese government announced its plans to begin considering measures to block traffic to piracy sites from the country, and requested internet service providers in the country to stop providing access to the three piracy sites named, including Mangamura. On April 17, the Mangamura website became inaccessible. It has been speculated that operator of the website may have closed it themselves.

On May 14 the same year, multiple major news outlets reported that the  had opened a criminal investigation into the website on suspicion of copyright infringement. On July 7, 2019, operator of Mangamura, Romi Hoshino (星野 ロミ), was caught by the National Bureau of Investigation in the Philippines. On September 24, he was deported to Japan, where he was arrested by the Japanese police on suspicion of violating the Japanese copyright law. On June 2, 2021, the  found Hoshino guilty of violating the copyright law and other charges, and sentenced him to three years in prison.

In 2020, the Japan Cartoonists Association issued a joint statement with Shuppan Koho Center (出版広報センター) in favor of revising the Japanese copyright law to make it illegal to download pirated materials in order to protect young artists from piracy.

References 

Anime and manga websites
Internet properties established in 2016
Internet properties disestablished in 2018
Copyright infringement
Cybercrime